Doline is a village in Serbia. It is situated in the Kanjiža municipality, in the North Banat District, Vojvodina province. The village has a Hungarian ethnic majority (96.89%) and its population numbering 516 people (2002 census).

Doline means sinkhole, though whether there is a connection is unclear. Karst topography, which was originally named in the Yugoslav-Italian area, includes sinkholes.

References

See also
List of places in Serbia
List of cities, towns and villages in Vojvodina

Places in Bačka